Nicolás Echavarría (born 4 August 1994) is a Colombian professional golfer who plays on the PGA Tour. He claimed his first PGA Tour victory in his rookie season at the Puerto Rico Open.

Amateur career
Echavarría attended the University of Arkansas from 2013 to 2017. He also represented Colombia in the Eisenhower Trophy in 2016.

Professional career
Echavarría turned professional in 2017. He won twice during the 2018 PGA Tour Latinoamérica season, finishing second in the Order of Merit, gaining a card for the 2019 Korn Ferry Tour season.

Echavarría gained a PGA Tour card for the 2022–23 season, via the 2022 Korn Ferry Tour Finals. In March 2023, he won the Puerto Rico Open. He shot a total of 21-under-par to win by two shots ahead of Akshay Bhatia.

Personal life
In 2015, during his time at the University of Arkansas, Echavarría was suspended from competing by the university after he was arrested and charged with felony voyeurism, alongside Taylor Moore. Charges against him were later dropped when it became apparent he was not involved despite being present when the incident occurred.

Echavarría's brother Andrés is also a professional golfer.

Professional wins (4)

PGA Tour wins (1)

PGA Tour Latinoamérica wins (2)

PGA Tour Latinoamérica Developmental Series wins (1)
2018 Abierto Club Campestre de Medellín

Results in The Players Championship

CUT = missed the halfway cut

Team appearances
Amateur
Eisenhower Trophy (representing Colombia): 2016

See also
2022 Korn Ferry Tour Finals graduates

References

External links

Colombian male golfers
PGA Tour golfers
Arkansas Razorbacks men's golfers
Sportspeople from Medellín
People from Ponte Vedra Beach, Florida
1994 births
Living people